Michael Graham-Smith (born 5 August 1969 in Burnie, Tasmania) is an Australian cricket umpire. He made his umpiring debut in domestic cricket on 4 October 2013, during the Ryobi One-Day Cup.

Graham-Smith taught mathematics at Elizabeth College in Hobart.

On 15 October 2022, he stood in his first Twenty20 International (T20I) match on 15 October 2022, between Indonesia and South Korea.

References

1969 births
Living people
Australian cricket umpires
Australian Twenty20 International cricket umpires
People from Burnie, Tasmania
Australian schoolteachers